Waterford Football Club formerly Waterford United Football Club is an Irish association football club based in Waterford who play in the League of Ireland First Division. The club was founded and elected to the league in 1930. Originally the club was based at the greyhound stadium known as Kilcohan Park, but has now moved to the Waterford Regional Sports Centre. In 2018 the club and its players became fully professional.

History

Waterford FC 1930–1982

Waterford first participated in the league in the 1930–31 season finishing ninth and again from 1931–32 before dropping out of the league for two seasons. Waterford re-entered the league in the 1935–36 season along with Sligo Rovers. Waterford won the Shield in their first season.

Waterford won the FAI cup for the first time in their history in 1937 beating St. James Gate and also won the Shield.

The club were league runners up in 1937–38 season and again in the 1940–41 season. Both Waterford and League winners Cork United finished on equal points but Cork were awarded the title as Waterford were unable to compete in the play-off due to a dispute regarding payment to players. At the end of the campaign, the original Waterford resigned from the League of Ireland, only for a new entity, with the same name, to be elected in, for 1944–45 season.
Waterford won the Shield again in the 1952–53 season and were again runners-up in the League this time to St. Patrick's Athletic in the 1954–55 season and again in the 1962–63 season.

The club eventually won the league title for the first time in the 1965–66 season, (under manager Paddy Coad) setting a then league record of 13 straight league victories. The 1965/66 title was the beginning of a hugely successful spell for the club domestically. The following season they played in the preliminary round of the Champions cup against Vorwärts Berlin, an East German and Army side, losing 6–1 at Dalymount Park and 6–0 in East Berlin.

They won the Shield once again in 1968–69 season. Waterford won the league title three times in a row, in 1968,1969 and in 1970. The title was won by Cork Hibernians in 1971 but returned to Waterford in the 1971–1972 season and again in the 1972–73 season. The following season Waterford won the League of Ireland Cup, however failed to regain the league title.

The Club won the FAI Cup for the second time under Tommy Jackson in 1980 beating St Patrick's Athletic with the winner from Brian Gardner.

Waterford's success in the league over the years brought European football where they played against famous clubs such as Manchester United and Celtic. Bobby Charlton had a brief spell at the club in 1976, playing three times and scoring one goal.

Waterford United 1982–2016

In May 1982, the Club changed its name to Waterford United. Alfie Hale was appointed manager. In 1985 the league's membership rose to 22 clubs with the election of six new clubs in 1985. This resulted in the introduction of the present two Division (Premier and First) structure in 1985/86 of which Waterford was a member of the Premier Division. Waterford were relegated to the First Division in the 1988–89 season. Their stay there was short, gaining promotion and winning the First Division title the following season 1989–90. They were unable to retain their Premier Division status the following season finishing in eleventh.

The club was promoted to the top flight in the 1991–92 season finishing as runners up to Limerick. But again the club were unable to remain in the Premier Division for more than a single season suffering relegation on goal difference to Drogheda United.

Waterford United were promoted to the Premier Division, finishing top of the First Division in the 1997–98 season and remained there until the 1999–00 season suffering relegation in the playoffs to Kilkenny City.

Jimmy McGeough was appointed manager in 2002. In his first season he led the club to promotion to the League of Ireland Premier Division in the 2002–03 season.

The League of Ireland changed from a winter league to a summer league for the 2003 season. Waterford finished 6th under Jimmy McGeough. Despite the good season he was controversially sacked, the decision was very unpopular with the club's supporters.

In 2004 The Blues finished 5th and they reached the FAI Cup Final, their first since 1986 under Alan Reynolds as player-manager and Paul McGrath as director of football but lost 2–1 to Longford Town.

In 2006 Waterford United were relegated to the First Division. The FAI took over the running of the League of Ireland at the end of the 2006 season. Part of this takeover involved the assessment of all League of Ireland sides and the manner in which they were being run including finances, infrastructure, future plans, marketability and previous finishing positions since the 2002 season, (this was due to Kildare County only joining the Eircom League in 2002). Despite finishing in 11th and last place ( Dublin City being the 12th team in the league and subsequently folding during the season) the club were forced to play a relegation/promotion playoff against Dundalk. Despite being defeated Waterford United still stood a chance of remaining a Premier Division side due to the FAI assessment. However, on 8 December 2006 the FAI decided to relegate Waterford to the 1st Division with Shamrock Rovers and Galway United replacing them and the now defunct Dublin City. Dundalk, despite beating Waterford in a playoff, were controversially overlooked and remained in the First Division. However, on 20 February 2007 it was announced that Waterford United had been invited to participate in the Premier Division for the forthcoming season. Club secretary Larry Gough stated "The club considered the proposal carefully and decided to accept the invitation in the best interests of football in Waterford and the eircom league". However, The "Blues" were relegated that season via the play-offs losing 6–3 on aggregate to Finn Harps.

After the club's relegation Waterford went into the 2008 season knowing that only one team from the First Division would be promoted as the FAI planned to revamp the league. A valiant effort from Cronin's Blues saw them come so close yet so far as the "Blues" fell away towards the business end of the season leaving Dundalk and Shelbourne to compete for promotion on the final day of the season.

In 2009 former Bohemians player, Stephen Henderson took over as boss at the Club and in his first season, the Blues narrowly missed out yet again for the playoffs and reached the EA Sports Cup Final where they were defeated 3–1 by Bohemians and the FAI Cup semi-finals. The club also finished in 4th in the League, missing out on the playoffs.

Henderson signed a one-year extension to his contract for the 2010 season. His side finished in 2nd place just three points off champions Derry City. His side came up against Monaghan United in the playoffs but were defeated 3–1 in the RSC.
 
In May 2011 Henderson was sacked after a run of poor form. Waterford native, Paul O'Brien was appointed manager for the duration of the season. Waterford United finished 5th in the 2011 League of Ireland First Division. The board in the off season then appointed Paul as full-time manager on a year contract for the 2012 season.

Paul O'Briens side fell narrowly short of promotion, they defeated champions Limerick four times in four games but still finished 4 points behind them. This meant the playoffs once again for Waterford. In the first section of the playoffs Waterford beat 3rd placed Longford Town 3–1 on aggregate. This set up a tie with Dundalk of the League of Ireland Premier Division. The first leg ended in a 2–2 draw in Oriel Park but Waterford were defeated 2–0 in the second leg at the RSC and would once again remain in the First Division.

The Blues were favourites to lift the Title in 2013 but during the season O'Brien resigned due to poor form. Waterford finished in 4th, missing out on the playoffs. During the 2013 season former manager Stephen Henderson was seeking compensation from his previous contract, Henderson claimed he was sacked despite the club claiming he resigned, the club's supporters were forced to step in and raise the money Henderson was owed before the club could be wound up. Tommy Griffin was appointed manager for the 2014 season. The club encountered financial difficulties once again, this led to the club slipping down the table to a 7th-place finish.

After a disappointing start to 2015 Griffin stepped aside into a new role in the club and Roddy Collins was appointed as manager on a two-and-a-half-year deal. Collins side finished 7th in his first season. In the 2016 season, Collins signed a lot of players he worked with before such as Philip Gorman, James O'Brien and his son, Roddy Collins Jr, and many others. With two games left in the 2016 season and Waterford in 6th it was announced Roddy Collins would leave the club.

Takeover and back to original name

After the suffering many years both on and off the pitch, the Club needed a big shake up from top to bottom. After weeks of speculation on social media the Club officially announced that Swindon Town chairman Lee Power had assumed control. Shortly after taking control, he outlined his plan to rebrand the Club from top to bottom, removing 'United' from the Club's name, going back to the original name of Waterford FC. He also wished to change the Club's crest and jersey to something more traditional. On 2 January 2017, the Club announced the new managerial team for the coming season. The new head coach was former player and manager Alan Reynolds and Pat Fenlon was appointed as the Club's new director of football. As the squad started to take shape, the Club officially announced on 20 January 2017 that they would change back to the Club's original identity with a name change to Waterford FC. They also unveiled the new crest which was a modernised version of the Club's first ever crest from 1930.
Under the new leadership Waterford FC signed high-profile players and ran the club in a new professional way. The club has developed a strong fanbase over the 2017 season and this was coupled with promotion to the League of Ireland Premier Division.

After Waterford beat Wexford 3–0 and Cobh Ramblers were defeated 3–0 by Cabinteely Waterford were officially crowned league champions and promoted back to the Premier Division for 2018.

Waterford qualified for the Europa League first qualifying round by finishing fourth in the 2018 League of Ireland Premier Division, but were ruled by UEFA to have not passed the "three-year rule" as the club were reformed in 2016. As a result, the berth was given to the fifth-placed team of the league, St Patrick's Athletic.

Reynolds resigned as manager on 16 June 2020.

On 4 June 2021, with the club bottom of the table, it was announced that Lee Power had sold the club to R&S Holdings Ltd, fronted by UK entrepreneur Richard Forrest who had bought the remaining stakes in the club having previously bought 33% earlier in the year.

The club finished 9th in the table, meaning they entered a relegation playoff.  Then manager Marc Bircham was sacked just days before the relegation play-off with UCD AFC and the team subsequently lost the playoff 2–1, returning Waterford to the First Division. On 14 June 2022, Waterford appointed Danny Searle as manager. Searle had previously been Aldershot Town manager

Players

Current squad

Technical staff

Club structure

Stadium
Waterford FC play their home games at the Waterford Regional Sports Centre, more commonly referred to as the RSC. They have played at the RSC since 1993. The stadium has two stands and holds a capacity of 5,154 with 3,035 seats. The record attendance at the RSC was for an FAI Cup semi final game in 1997 against Shelbourne where Waterford were defeated 2–1 in front of 8,500 people, this was when spectators were permitted to stand on the running track in the ground. The RSC also hosted the 2009 League of Ireland Cup final where Bohemians defeated Waterford 3–1. Before moving to the RSC Waterford played at Kilcohan Park.

Supporters and rivalries

Supporters

The club draws its support not only from Waterford City, but also from Waterford County and the South East region as a whole.  Waterford fans have organised themselves into two groups - both official and unofficial.

Groups
Blues Supporter Club (B.S.C)

The Blues Supporters Club is the official Waterford FC fans group. It was formed in December 2009 after members of the IBSC (Independent Blues Supporters Club) voted to become an official fans group. From the 2010 season, the BSC organises transport for Blues fans to away games, run the Club shop as well as organise numerous fund raising activities and other match day activities for Waterford FC. There is also a branch of the BSC based in Dungarvan that accommodates Blues fans living in West Waterford. Membership is now open for the 2018 season and information can be found on Waterford FC home page and on Facebook. The current chairperson of the BSC is Shane Murphy.

The Block E Boys
 
The BAU (Blue Army Ultras) was formed in January 2006 to bring an Italian-style Ultra atmosphere to the RSC and to away matches. During the 2016 season, the group went through a restructure and changed the name to "The Block E Boys".

Rivals
Waterford contest the Munster Derby with Cork City. Waterford had big derbies with Cork City in the 2000s when Waterford were in the Premier Division and then again when Cork City Foras entered the First Division in the early 2010s. The derby with Cork always being Munsters biggest clash died off when Cork City started challenging the top of the table in the Premier Division and Waterford plummeted to the bottom end of the First Division around 2014. When Waterford drew Cork in the cups the club would usually be easily beaten. When Waterford played Cork in Turners Cross in the EA Sports Cup in 2016 they were beaten 7–0. However the rivalry was somewhat rekindled in 2017 after Waterford were taken over by Lee Power, a heavy challenge by Patrick McClean on Corks Sean Maguire caused controversy, it led to a huge dispute on social media between Waterford and Cork players with Irish internationals James McClean and Shane Duffy also getting involved defending Patrick's tackle. And despite Waterford being in the First Division they manage to secure the signing of Waterford born Cork centre back Kenny Browne who was on the back of a great season where he starred for the rebels as they won the FAI Cup. The move caused huge controversy with Cork manager John Caulfield. Both clubs are now back in the top division for 2018 along with Limerick.
 
Waterford have also had a local south east derby game against near neighbours Wexford since 2007 but there has never been any significant rivalry between the clubs.

Waterford had a big rivalry with Shamrock Rovers in the 1960s and 70s. The and is referred to as the 'old feud' in recent times.

Honours 
League of Ireland: 6
 1965–66, 1967–68 , 1968–69, 1969–70, 1971–72 , 1972–73 
FAI Cup: 2
1936–37, 1979–80
League of Ireland First Division: 4
 1989–90, 1997–98, 2002–03, 2017
League of Ireland Cup: 2
 1973–74, 1984–85
League of Ireland Shield: 5
 1930–31, 1936–37, 1952–53, 1958–59, 1968–69
LFA President's Cup: 1
 1973–74
 Top Four Cup : 5
 1967–68, 1968–69, 1969–70, 1970–71, 1972–73
 Texaco Cup: 1
 1974–75
Munster Senior League: 1
 1932–33
Munster Senior Cup: 15
 1934–35, 1945–46, 1947–48, 1955–56, 1956–57, 1965–66, 1966–67, 1975–76, 1980–81, 1985–86, 1986–87, 2007, 2009, 2010, 2013
Dr Tony O'Neill Cup: 1
 2000–01
Enda McGuill Cup: 1
 2001–02

European record

Overview

Matches

Notes
 PR: Preliminary round
 1R: First round
 2R: Second round

Notable former players
Republic of Ireland internationals

League of Ireland XI representatives

Republic of Ireland U23 internationals
  Derek McGrath

Republic of Ireland U21 internationals

Republic of Ireland B internationals
  Dan Connor
  Neale Fenn

Republic of Ireland U17 internationals
  Gary Dempsey

Other Internationals

Former managers

Kits and colours
The club's colours have always been primarily blue with white trim since the 1930s influenced mainly by the colours of County Waterford. The club's current kit for the 2020 season is manufactured by Umbro with the traditional blue home kit and a white away kit. The club are also currently sponsored 24/7 Cardiac Cover for the Southeast .

The away kits over the years have mainly been white with blue trim, however the club has had a number of yellow kits throughout the years, the last yellow kit the club had was in the 2016 season, for the 2012 and 2013 season Waterford has a green third kit with white trim similar to the Republic of Ireland national team's kit. In 2010 Waterford had a very rare red away kit with white trim that wasn't received well with supporters.

Some of the kit manufactures for the club over the years include Umbro, Adidas, Nike, Uhlsport, Macron, Azzurri and Diadora.

References

External links
Official website
Waterford FC at SSE Airtricity League.
Waterford FC on RTÉ Sport.
Waterford FC on Extratime.ie.
Travels with the Blues blog.

 
1930 establishments in Ireland
Association football clubs in County Waterford
Association football clubs established in 1930
Former League of Ireland First Division clubs
Organisations based in Waterford (city)
Sport in Waterford (city)
League of Ireland Premier Division clubs